Tetraiodine nonoxide is an iodine oxide with the chemical formula I4O9.

Preparation 
Tetraiodine nonoxide can be produced by reacting ozone and iodine in carbon tetrachloride at −78 °C:
 2I2 + 9O3 -> I4O9 + 9O2

It can also be produced by heating iodic acid and phosphoric acid together:
 8 HIO3 -> 2 I4O9 + 4 H2O + O2

Properties
Tetraiodine nonoxide is a light yellow solid that can easily hydrolyze. It decomposes above 75 °C:
4 I4O9 -> 6 I2O5 + 2 I2 + 3 O2

Like diiodine tetroxide, tetraiodine nonoxide contains both I(III) and I(V), and disproportionate to iodate and iodide under alkaline conditions:
 3 I4O9 + 12 OH- -> I- + 11 IO3- + 6 H2O.

It reacts with water to form iodic acid and iodine:
4I4O9 + 9H2O -> 18HIO3 + I2

References 

Iodine compounds
Oxides